Látal (feminine Látalová) is a Czech surname.. Notable people include:
 Jan Látal (b. 1990) Czech ice hockey player
 Jiří Látal (b. 1967) Czech ice hockey player
 Martin Látal (b. 1988) Czech ice hockey player
 Ondřej Látal (b. 1981) Czech ice hockey player
 Radoslav Látal (b. 1970) Czech football player and manager
 Stanislav Látal (1919-1994) Czech animator and puppet-film maker

References

Czech-language surnames